The 2001 Mountain West Conference men's basketball tournament was played at the Thomas & Mack Center in Las Vegas, Nevada from March 8–10, 2001.  Only 7 of the conference's 8 member schools would compete in the tournament.  Host school UNLV was banned from postseason play in the wake of rules violations while recruiting Lamar Odom that ultimately led to the ouster of head coach Bill Bayno.  The format of the tournament was temporarily changed, giving regular season champion Utah a quarterfinal bye to await the winner of the New Mexico-Colorado State game.  Of note, this marked the first time that UNLV failed to appear in the championship game of the league tournament while held at the Thomas & Mack Center.  As of 2011, eleven MWC Tournaments had been held in Las Vegas, with UNLV appearing in all but three championship games (2001, 2009).

Second seeded BYU would win the tournament and the league's automatic NCAA Tournament bid with a 69–65 win over #5 seed New Mexico.

Bracket

References 

Mountain West Conference men's basketball tournament
Tournament
Mountain West Conference men's basketball tournament
Mountain West Conference men's basketball tournament